Bertram Pollock (6 December 186317 October 1943) was an Anglican bishop in the first half of the 20th century.

Born in Hanworth, Middlesex, on 6 December 1863 to George Frederick Pollock — a barrister and Remembrancer to Queen Victoria and Edward VII — and his wife Frances, Bertram was the youngest of five sons, and also had a younger sister. His brother Ernest, a Conservative MP and Master of the Rolls, was created Viscount Hanworth in 1936. George Frederick was the third son of Frederick Pollock, 1st Baronet, of a family descended from David Pollok (sic) of that Ilk (died 1546), a member of the Scottish Clan Pollock. The Montagu-Pollock baronets descend from Frederick's younger brother, George.

Bertram was educated at Charterhouse and Trinity College, Cambridge. He was ordained in the Church of England — made a deacon in Advent 1890 (21 December) and ordained a priest the Advent following (20 December 1891), both times by John Wordsworth, Bishop of Salisbury in Salisbury Cathedral. He was a Master and Chaplain at Marlborough and later Headmaster of Wellington College (1893–1910). There, one of his students was the author Harold Nicolson, who considered Pollock one of "the two who have influenced my intelligence" and "the most fascinating man I shall ever meet."

An Honorary Chaplain to the King, he was appointed to the episcopate as Bishop of Norwich in 1910, a post he held for 32 years. He was consecrated a bishop on St Mark's Day 1910 (25 April), by Randall Davidson, Archbishop of Canterbury, at St Paul's Cathedral. An author, he died on 17 October 1943, leaving his wife Joan Florence Helena (they married 11 October 1928; she was daughter of Algernon Charles Dudley Ryder and a scion of the Earls of Harrowby), and a daughter, (Mary) Rosalind Frances Felicia (born 24 April 1931). Bertram was made a Knight Commander of the Royal Victorian Order (KCVO) in 1921 and a Doctor of Divinity (DD).

Works
Good Men Without Faith, 1923
The Church and English Life, 1932
The Nation and the Nation's Worship, 1933
Church and State, 1936

References

External links

1863 births
Anglican clergy from London
People from Feltham
1943 deaths
People educated at Charterhouse School
Alumni of Trinity College, Cambridge
Honorary Chaplains to the King
Bishops of Norwich
20th-century Scottish Episcopalian bishops
Knights Commander of the Royal Victorian Order
Masters of Wellington College, Berkshire
19th-century Anglican theologians
20th-century Anglican theologians